42–44 Mortimer Street is an architecturally notable former youth hostel in Mortimer Street, in the City of Westminster, London. It was designed by Arthur Beresford Pite and is grade II listed with Historic England. A London County Council plaque on the building records that the sculptor Joseph Nollekens once lived on a house on the site.

References

External links 
 

Grade II listed buildings in the City of Westminster
Fitzrovia
YWCA buildings
Buildings and structures completed in 1904
Arts and Crafts architecture in London